Rogue is a novel by Danielle Steel, published by Delacorte Press in June 2008. The book is Steel's seventy-fifth best selling novel.

Plot summary
Maxine Williams is a well-known and leading child psychiatrist, specializing in trauma and suicide, with three amazing children Daphne, Jack and Sam and a rich and glamorous ex-husband. Blake Williams, one of the richest men in the world has a glamorous life of globe travelling and dating beautiful women whilst Maxine stays in Manhattan looking after their children and pursuing the career she loves. Though divorced, both are extremely affectionate to each other.

Blake soon meets the beautiful Arabella and falls deeply in love. Meanwhile Max also starts dating a doctor, Charles West. But Charles is a bit uncomfortable with the children and even starts showing his irritation by suggesting that the kids should be sent to a boarding school. The eldest one, Daphne starts becoming possessive of both her parents and behaves rudely to both Arabella and Charles.

When a tragedy strikes in Morocco, Blake and Max join hands to help the victims and orphaned children. Blake transforms into a responsible man, much to Max's surprise. Blake throws Arabella out after she deceives him. Max and Charles plan to wed soon but Max finds herself happy only in Blake's company while Charles constantly hurts Blake by behaving rudely whenever he was around. After a series of hilarious events, Max and Blake marry again, much to the delight of their kids.

Footnotes
http://www.randomhouse.com/features/steel/bookshelf/display.pperl?isbn=9780440243298
http://www.booksattransworld.co.uk/catalog/book.htm?command=Search&db=twmain.txt&eqisbndata=055215475X
http://www.whsmith.co.uk/CatalogAndSearch/ProductDetails-Rogue+-9780552154758.html

2008 American novels
American romance novels
Novels by Danielle Steel
Delacorte Press books
Contemporary romance novels

ne:रोग (उपन्यास)